Oleksandr Nykyforovych Zhuravlyov; (born 1 September 1945 in Luhansk) is a retired Soviet football player and a Ukrainian coach.

Honours
 Soviet Top League winner: 1972.

International career
Zhuravlyov made his debut for USSR on 29 June 1972 in a friendly against Uruguay. He was the team's captain for the 3 games he played.

References
  Profile

1945 births
Living people
Soviet footballers
Soviet Union international footballers
Ukrainian footballers
Ukrainian football managers
Soviet Top League players
FC Zorya Luhansk players
Ukrainian Premier League managers
FC Zorya Luhansk managers
Footballers from Luhansk
Association football midfielders
Association football defenders